George Corley Wallace State Community College (referred to as Wallace Community College Selma or WCCS) is a community college in Selma, Alabama.  As of the Fall 2010 semester, WCCS has an enrollment of 1,938 students.  The college was founded in 1963.  WCCS fields baseball and basketball teams as a member of the Alabama Community College Conference of the National Junior College Athletic Association.

References

External links

Community colleges in Alabama
Education in Selma, Alabama
Educational institutions established in 1963
Buildings and structures in Selma, Alabama
1963 establishments in Alabama
NJCAA athletics
George Wallace